The discography of Casting Crowns, an American Christian rock band, consists of eight studio albums, two independent albums, two holiday albums, five live albums, and 24 singles. Casting Crowns was formed in 1999 as a student worship band in Daytona Beach, Florida, with a lineup consisting of Mark Hall (vocals), Melodee DeVevo (violin), Juan DeVevo (guitars) and Hector Cervantes (guitars). The band relocated to McDonough, Georgia in 2001 and added Chris Huffman (bass guitar), Megan Garrett (keyboard) and Andy Williams (drums). The band released two independent records, one of which was discovered by Mark Miller, a country musician. Miller signed the band to his record label, Beach Street Records, a division of Reunion Records.

Casting Crowns released their self-titled debut album in 2003, which peaked at No. 59 on the Billboard 200 and No. 2 on the Billboard Christian Albums chart. The album has sold over 1.9 million copies in the United States since its release and has been certified double platinum by the Recording Industry Association of America (RIAA). The band's second album, Lifesong, was released in 2005 and became their first top-ten album on the Billboard 200 and their first No. 1 album on the Christian Albums chart; it has sold 1.4 million copies in the United States and has been certified platinum.

The band released The Altar and the Door, their third album, in 2007; it debuted at No. 2 on the Billboard 200, selling a total of 129,000 copies in its first week. It has sold over 1.2 million copies in the United States and has been certified platinum. Casting Crowns' fourth studio album, Until the Whole World Hears, was released in 2009 and sold 167,000 copies in its first week, debuting at No. 4 on the Billboard 200. It has sold 1.1 million copies and has been certified platinum. The band's fifth album, Come to the Well, was released in October 2011 and debuted at No. 2 on the Billboard 200 with a total of 99,000 copies sold in its first week. It has sold 779,000 copies in the United States and has been certified gold. Their sixth album, Thrive, was released in January 2014, selling 45,000 copies in its first week. It has been certified gold. The band's latest album, Only Jesus, was released on November 16, 2018.

In addition to their studio albums, Casting Crowns has also released a holiday album, Peace on Earth, which has been certified platinum, and four of the band's live CD/DVD albums have been certified gold or platinum by the RIAA. Four of the band's singles have been certified platinum, and three have been certified gold.

Albums

Studio albums

Independent albums

Holiday albums

Live albums

Other albums

Singles

Other charting songs

References

Notes

Footnotes

External links
Official website
Allmusic biography

Discographies of American artists
Christian music discographies